"The One with Barry and Mindy's Wedding" is the twenty-fourth and final episode of Friends second season. It first aired on the NBC network in the United States on May 16, 1996.

Plot
Joey is up for a role in a movie directed by Warren Beatty. The role calls for him to kiss another man – something Joey has trouble doing. At first he asks the girls to kiss him and let him know if he is really a bad kisser; Phoebe agrees on grounds that she had already kissed Joey once before. Phoebe judges that Joey has a firm and tender kiss and she would recommend him to a friend. Monica suggests that Joey has a problem kissing men, and which makes him very uncomfortable. He tries to get Ross and Chandler to help him, but with little success. Ross finally relents and surprises Joey with a kiss. Joey then reveals that they had already picked someone else for the role but thanks Ross for helping out.

Rachel reluctantly agrees to be maid of honor at her ex-fiancé Barry's wedding, but inadvertently steals the couple's thunder when she walks up the aisle with her dress tucked into her orange panties. She is even angrier to find out that when she dumped Barry at the altar, his parents told everyone that she ran away because she was insane because she had syphilis. Rachel is about to leave, but stops when she learns that Barry was betting on her to leave before 9:45. She tells Barry that she promised herself she would make it through at least one of his weddings. She then sings "Copacabana" at the wedding, a song she was unable to perform at high school.

Monica is anxious to find out what the future has in store for her and Richard. They talk, and realise they want different things in life. Monica wants to have children of her own, but Richard does not want to have any more kids. Later, Richard says he will have kids with her if that is what Monica wants, but she tells him that she cannot have kids with someone who does not really want them, and they reluctantly agree to break up.

Chandler has met a woman online – they chat late into the night. Things go well until she reveals that she is married and that her husband is cheating on her. At Phoebe's urging, Chandler decides to look past that. They agree to meet in person at Central Perk – and his online girlfriend turns out to be Janice. The two immediately get back together, much to the others' chagrin.

Production
The sub-plot where Joey has to kiss a man was originally intended to be a story about Joey auditioning for the role of an uncircumcised man. The rest of the group then came up with various ways of making him look the part. The story was changed on the advice of network censors, who thought it was tasteless but it was later used in "The One with Ross and Monica's Cousin".

Trivia

In this episode Joel, the best-man and friend of Rachel at the wedding, is portrayed by acclaimed producer Peter Spears, winner of 1 Academy Award and candidated for many multiple awards for his production of the blockbuster hit "Call Me By Your Name'". Spears is married to fellow producer Brian Swardstrom, that actually is also a talent-manager and that discover Timothée Chalamet, who starred in that same movie.

Reception
In the original broadcast, the episode was viewed by 29.0 million viewers.
 
Sam Ashurst from Digital Spy ranked the episode #168 on their ranking of the 236 Friends episodes, and wrote: "One of the most significant episodes, even if it's probably not the funniest".
 
Telegraph & Argus also ranked the episode #168 on their ranking of all 236 Friends episodes, and wrote that Chandler's line "It's a website, it's the Guggenheim museum. She likes art, and well, I like funny words" was the best in the episode.

BT TV ranked "The One with Barry and Mindy's Wedding" #168 on their ranking of the 236 Friends episodes.

References

1996 American television episodes
Friends (season 2) episodes